L.A. Firefighters, also known as Fire Co. 132, is an American drama television series starring Jarrod Emick. The series premiered June 3, 1996, on Fox.

Cast
 Jarrod Emick as Captain Jack Malloy
 Christine Elise as Firefighter Erin Coffey
 Rob Youngblood as Pilot Jed Neal
 Brian Smiar as Fire Chief Dick Coffey, Erin's Father
 Alexandra Hedison as Firefighter Kay Rizzo
 Brian Leckner as Firefighter J.B. Baker
 Carlton Wilborn as Firefighter Ray Grimes
 Elizabeth Mitchell as Jack, Malloy's Wife Laura
 Miguel Sandoval as Fire Marshal Bernie Ramirez
 Alexandra Paul as Firefighter T.K. Martin

Production
After the initial six-episode summer run, the series was retitled and given new cast members. Criticism of the show from the L.A. County Fire Fighters Union led to the series being retitled Fire Co. 132. The retooled series never aired.

Episodes
Thirteen episodes are registered with the United States Copyright Office.

L.A. Firefighters

Fire Co. 132

References

External links

1990s American drama television series
1996 American television series debuts
1996 American television series endings
Fox Broadcasting Company original programming
Television series about firefighting
Television shows set in Los Angeles
Television series by 20th Century Fox Television